Jake Edwards may refer to:

Jake Edwards (Australian footballer) (born 1988), Australian rules footballer
Jake Edwards (footballer, born 1976), English/American professional footballer
Jake Edwards (radio personality), Canada based radio personality